The Definitive Collection is a 2000 greatest hits compilation album of 11 Partridge Family and 9 David Cassidy songs. A longer version included four additional David Cassidy tracks.

Critical reception

Lindsay Planer of AllMusic concludes, "While earnest enthusiasts will probably choose to locate the individual reissues, for all non-completists and otherwise average fans, this Definitive Collection lives up to its name."

Track listing

Track information and credits adapted AllMusic, and verified from the album's liner notes.

References

The Partridge Family albums
David Cassidy albums
2001 compilation albums
Albums produced by Wes Farrell
Arista Records compilation albums